Lagat is a surname. Notable people with the surname include:
 Bernard Lagat (born 1974), Kenyan-American middle- and long-distance runner
 Cleophas Lagat, Kenyan politician and Governor of Nandi County
 Elijah Lagat (born 1966), Kenyan marathon runner
 Viola Cheptoo Lagat (born 1989), Kenyan middle-distance runner

See also
Langat (surname), a related Kalenjin surname

Kalenjin names